Rosa Morena (11 July 1940 – 4 December 2019) was a Spanish flamenco pop star who achieved international fame during the 1970s disco era, with the song, "Échale guindas al pavo". Morena was born in Badajoz, Extremadura, Spain.

Her career began at the age of 8. When she was 12 she debuted in Madrid and at the age of 15 she began a tour through the stages of France, Belgium, Latin America and United States, where she acted with artists like Frank Sinatra, Ella Fitzgerald, Celia Cruz and Dean Martin. In New York, she was considered by the critics as "The best artist in the City of Skyscrapers".

Filmography
 Alborada en cartagena: El secreto de las esmeraldas (1966), co-starring Julio Pérez Tabernero, Arturo Correa and Enrique Pontón, directed by Sebastián Almeida.
 Flor salvaje (1968), co-starring Luis Dávila, Antonio Prieto Puerto and Mónica Randall, directed by Javier Setó.
 Entre ríos y encinares (1971), documentary film directed by Julio Pérez Tabernero.

References

External links
 Rosa Morena YouTube channel
 Rosa Morena Gallery
 Rosa Morena's complete filmography and discography

1941 births
2019 deaths
People from Badajoz
Spanish pop singers
Flamenco singers
Deaths from breast cancer
Deaths from cancer in Spain
Spanish women singers